The Golden Bullet is a 1921 German silent adventure film directed by Robert Wuellner and starring Gertrude Welcker, Erich Kaiser-Titz and Otto Treptow. It premiered in Berlin on 24 March 1921.

Cast
 Gertrude Welcker as die Frau
 Erich Kaiser-Titz as Der Graf
 Otto Treptow as Der Detektiv
 Paul Richter
 Max Adalbert
 Ernst Behmer
 Albert Patry

References

Bibliography
 Grange, William. Cultural Chronicle of the Weimar Republic. Scarecrow Press, 2008.

External links

1921 films
Films of the Weimar Republic
German silent feature films
German adventure films
Films directed by Robert Wuellner
German black-and-white films
1921 adventure films
Silent adventure films
1920s German films